Ensiferum is the debut studio album by Finnish folk metal band Ensiferum. It was released on 9 July 2001 on Spinefarm Records.

Track listing

Personnel

Band members 
 Jari Mäenpää − guitar, vocals
 Markus Toivonen − guitar
 Jukka-Pekka Miettinen − bass guitar
 Oliver Fokin − drums, percussion

Guests
 Henri Sorvali (a.k.a. Trollhorn) − keyboards
 Marita Toivonen − kantele
 Johanna Vakkuri − vocals
 Teemu Saari − vocals
 Antti Mikkonen − vocals

References

2001 debut albums
Ensiferum albums
Albums with cover art by Kristian Wåhlin